Pioneer Museum may refer to:

United States 

 Pioneer Museum Complex in Fredericksburg, Texas
 Colorado Springs Pioneers Museum in Colorado Springs, Colorado

Other museums 
 Pionier Museum, Pretoria
 Pioneer Village (disambiguation)

See also
Settlement (migration)

American West museums